Wilton is a city in Burleigh and McLean counties in North Dakota, United States. It is part of the "Bismarck, ND Metropolitan Statistical Area" or "Bismarck-Mandan". The population was 718 at the 2020 census. Founded in 1899, Wilton was named by General W. D. Washburn after the town of Wilton in his native state of Maine.

History
Wilton was platted in 1899 when the railroad was extended to that point. The city was named after Wilton, Maine, the native home of an early settler. The Wilton Train Station was completed in 1900 and the post office has been in operation at Wilton also since 1900.
 Wilton was originally built up chiefly by Ukrainians.

Geography
Wilton is located at  (47.159011, -100.785903).

Demographics

2010 census
As of the census of 2010, there were 711 people, 317 households, and 188 families residing in the city. The racial makeup of the city was 96.3% White, 2.1% Native American, 0.1% Asian, 0.6% from other races, and 0.8% from two or more races. Hispanic or Latino of any race were 1.3% of the population.

There were 317 households, of which 24.3% had children under the age of 18 living with them, 47.6% were married couples living together, 6.3% had a female householder with no husband present, 5.4% had a male householder with no wife present, and 40.7% were non-families. 35.0% of all households were made up of individuals, and 12.3% had someone living alone who was 65 years of age or older. The average household size was 2.17 and the average family size was 2.79.

The median age in the city was 46.7 years. 19.7% of residents were under the age of 18; 7.4% were between the ages of 18 and 24; 20.8% were from 25 to 44; 32.9% were from 45 to 64; and 19.3% were 65 years of age or older. The gender makeup of the city was 53.2% male and 46.8% female.

2000 census

As of the census of 2000, there were 807 people, 309 households, and 219 families residing in the city. The population density was 1,395.3 people per square mile (537.2/km). There were 347 housing units at an average density of 599.9 per square mile (231.0/km). The racial makeup of the city was 98.27% White, 0.12% African American, 0.74% Native American, and 0.87% from two or more races. Hispanic or Latino of any race were 0.37% of the population.

There were 309 households, out of which 37.9% had children under the age of 18 living with them, 57.6% were married couples living together, 9.1% had a female householder with no husband present, and 29.1% were non-families. 23.9% of all households were made up of individuals, and 12.6% had someone living alone who was 65 years of age or older. The average household size was 2.57 and the average family size was 3.04.

In the city, the population was spread out, with 28.5% under the age of 18, 6.8% from 18 to 24, 27.5% from 25 to 44, 22.1% from 45 to 64, and 15.1% who were 65 years of age or older. The median age was 37 years. For every 100 females, there were 93.5 males. For every 100 females age 18 and over, there were 93.0 males.

The median income for a household in the city was $34,583, and the median income for a family was $39,063. Males had a median income of $28,750 versus $20,833 for females. The per capita income for the city was $17,111. About 8.0% of families and 10.8% of the population were below the poverty line, including 12.2% of those under age 18 and 17.1% of those age 65 or over.

Climate
This climatic region is typified by large seasonal temperature differences, with warm to extremely hot (and often humid) summers and severely cold winters.  According to the Köppen Climate Classification system, Wilton has a humid continental climate, abbreviated "Dfb" on climate maps.

See also
 List of cities in North Dakota

References

External links

 
 Wilton diamond jubilee, 1899-1974 from the Digital Horizons website

Cities in Burleigh County, North Dakota
Cities in McLean County, North Dakota
Cities in North Dakota
Populated places established in 1899
1899 establishments in North Dakota
Ukrainian communities in the United States